Tomasz Makowski may refer to:
 Tomasz Makowski (librarian)
 Tomasz Makowski (footballer)